Democratic Renovator Party can refer to:

 Democratic Renewal Party (Angola)
 Democratic Renovator Party (Portugal)

See also
 Renovation (disambiguation)
 Democratic Party (disambiguation)